The 2022–23 season is the 126th season in the history of Yverdon-Sport FC and their second consecutive season in the second division. The club are participating in Swiss Challenge League and the Swiss Cup. The season covers the period from 1 July 2022 to 30 June 2023.

Players

Pre-season and friendlies

Competitions

Overall record

Swiss Challenge League

League table

Results summary

Results by round

Matches 
The league fixtures were announced on 17 June 2022.

Swiss Cup

References 

Yverdon-Sport FC
Yverdon